1979 general election may refer to:
1979 Austrian legislative election
1979 Danish general election
1979 Portuguese legislative election
1979 Spanish general election
1979 Swedish general election
1979 United Kingdom general election
1979 Zimbabwe Rhodesia general election

Canada
1979 Canadian federal election
1979 Alberta general election
1979 British Columbia general election
1977 Manitoba general election
1979 Northwest Territories general election
1979 Prince Edward Island general election